Olympia Tech Park is the largest and one of the oldest Information Technology office locations in Chennai, India. Various companies have acquired office space in this business park, including Fortune 100 companies. It is located in the Inner Ring Road, Chennai just near the TANSIDCO Industry and the Kathipara Junction. With about 1.8 million sq. ft. area, it is also the first large green building in the city.

The buildings
The technology park consists of three towers (phases), namely, Citius, Altius and Fortius. The park was completed in 2006, comprising a total area of 8 lakh square feet. Unlike the other major technology giants who have established themselves in the IT Corridor and Velachery, Olympia has gone all the way by creating a name in the Inner Ring Road where fewer IT Parks are present. It is located about 5 km from the Airport and 1.2  km from the Guindy Bus Station.

Occupants

References

External links

 Olympia, Home 
 Olympia Tech Park 

Software technology parks in Chennai